Lizzie Vann  is the founder of Organix, an organic children's food company, based in Christchurch, Dorset.

Biography
Vann studied biology at the University of Lancaster, and then worked as an investment analyst in the City of London. Ongoing health problems, and the belief that more and more parents shared her concern regarding the safety of children's food, led her to set up Organix in 1992, offering parents a healthier alternative to mass-produced children's food.

Vann has campaigned for improvements to children's food, including calling on the British Government to regulate more heavily the issue of pesticide residues in food consumed by children, and ban all synthetic dyes and flavour-enhancing additives in children's food.

She was also one of three founding members of the Soil Association's Food For Life programme, and from 2007 to 2009 was the chairman of the Soil Association's Organic Trade Group.  
	
Vann sold the company to the Hero group in 2008 and has subsequently invested the proceeds in projects that promote child health and food quality, and renewable energy developments.

In 2019 Vann bought the Bearsville Theater complex in Bearsville, NY for $2.5 million and in 2022 bought Cafe Espresso, in Woodstock, NY.

Awards
Vann has won a European Woman of Achievement Award, the Caroline Walker Award for campaigning work in the food industry, the Organic Trophy from the Soil Association in 2002, and an MBE for Services to Children's Food.

References

English farmers
English environmentalists
Alumni of Lancaster University
Members of the Order of the British Empire
Living people
Year of birth missing (living people)